Sir William Verner, 2nd Baronet (4 April 1822 – 10 January 1873), was a British soldier and Conservative Party politician.

Sir William Verner was the son of Sir William Verner, 1st Baronet, and of Harriet Wingfield, daughter of Colonel Edward Wingfield, who was the younger son of The 3rd Viscount Powerscourt.

After serving in the Coldstream Guards in 1841, Verner married on 6 August 1850 Mary Pakenham, daughter of Lieutenant-General the Hon. Sir Hercules Robert Pakenham. Their children included William, Edith and Alice Emily (died 1908). Alice married firstly Christopher Nevile Bagot of Augharne Castle, County Galway, who died in 1877, having by his last will disinherited their son William, a decision which led to the celebrated probate case Bagot v. Bagot, in which Alice successfully defended her son's rights. She married, secondly, Major Reginald Roberts.

The family lived in both London and on the Churchill Estate in the northwest of County Armagh in Ulster. In the early 1860s they  moved to Corke Abbey, a Wingfield estate,  also in Ulster.

He was Member of Parliament for County Armagh between 1868 and 1873.

He died in 1873, one year after making a will and almost exactly two years following the death of his father. He was buried in Loughgall, County Armagh.

Arms

See also
 Verner baronets

References

1822 births
1873 deaths
Baronets in the Baronetage of the United Kingdom
Irish Conservative Party MPs
Members of the Parliament of the United Kingdom for County Armagh constituencies (1801–1922)
UK MPs 1868–1874
Coldstream Guards officers